Hong Kong competed at the 1976 Summer Olympics in Montreal, Quebec, Canada. 25 competitors, 23 men and 2 women, took part in 27 events in 6 sports.

Canoeing

 Hui Cheong Canoeing   
 John Wai Canoeing
 Kwan Honk Wai  Canoeing
 Mak Chi Wai Canoeing  
 Ng Hin Wan Canoeing     
 Ng Tsuen Man Canoeing

Cycling

Four cyclists represented Hong Kong in 1976.

Individual road race
 Kwong Chi Yan — did not finish (→ no ranking) 
 Chan Fai Lui — did not finish (→ no ranking) 
 Tang Kam Man — did not finish (→ no ranking) 
 Chan Lam Hams — did not finish (→ no ranking)

Team time trial
 Chan Fai Lui
 Chan Lam Hams
 Kwong Chi Yan
 Tang Kam Man

1000m time trial
 Chan Fai Lui — 1:16.957 (→ 28th place)

Individual pursuit
 Tang Kam Man — 24th place

Fencing

Four fencers, all men, represented Hong Kong in 1976.

Men's foil
 Ng Wing Biu
 Kam Wai Leung
 Chan Matthew

Men's team foil
 Chan Matthew, Denis Cunningham, Kam Wai Leung, Ng Wing Biu

Men's épée
 Kam Wai Leung
 Denis Cunningham
 Chan Matthew

Men's team épée
 Chan Matthew, Denis Cunningham, Kam Wai Leung, Ng Wing Biu

Men's sabre
 Kam Wai Leung

Judo

 Mok Cheuk Wing Judo

Shooting

 Tso Hin Yip Shooting
 Reginald Dos Remedios Shooting     
 Chow Tsun Man Shooting     
Peter Rull Sr. (Estonia) Shooting     
Camilo Pedro  Shooting     
Solomon Lee Kui Nang Shooting

Swimming

 Karen Robertson Swimming     
Raphaelynne Lee Swimming     
Mark Anthony Crocker Swimming     
Lawrence Kwoh Swimming

References

External links
Hong Kong

Nations at the 1976 Summer Olympics
1976 Summer Olympics
1976 in Hong Kong sport